Alanganallur is a panchayat town in Madurai district in the state of Tamil Nadu, India. It is the headquarters of the Alanganallur revenue block.

Geography

Climate
Alanganallur's climate is moderate with no extremes. This place is well irrigated by Periyar sub canal. People of different religions and castes live here. All people, irrespective of caste and religion, agitated for Jallikattu in the year 2017.

Politics
It is part of the Madurai (Lok Sabha constituency). S. Venkatesan also known as  Su. Venkatesan from CPI(M) is the Member of Parliament, Lok Sabha, after his election in the 2019 Indian general election.

Economy
Agriculture is carried out in about large area around this place. Paddy, Sugar cane, Coconut and Plantain are the major crops. There is a sugar factory located within 1 km from Alanganallur.

Places nearby
Madurai is accessible within 16 km. Alagar kovil is also close by, within 18 km.  The Thadakai Amman falls (Kutladampatti) are located near T. Mettupatti village. 
('Sathiyar') near Palamedu.
Kodaikanal, 
Vaigai dam, 
Kumbakarai falls

References 

Cities and towns in Madurai district
Jallikattu